In enzymology, a scyllo-inosamine 4-kinase is an enzyme that catalyzes the chemical reaction

ATP + 1-amino-1-deoxy-scyllo-inositol  ADP + 1-amino-1-deoxy-scyllo-inositol 4-phosphate

Thus, the two substrates of this enzyme are ATP and 1-amino-1-deoxy-scyllo-inositol, whereas its two products are ADP and 1-amino-1-deoxy-scyllo-inositol 4-phosphate.

This enzyme belongs to the family of transferases, specifically those transferring phosphorus-containing groups (phosphotransferases) with an alcohol group as acceptor.  The systematic name of this enzyme class is ATP:1-amino-1-deoxy-scyllo-inositol 4-phosphotransferase. Other names in common use include scyllo-inosamine kinase (phosphorylating), scyllo-inosamine kinase, and ATP:inosamine phosphotransferase.  This enzyme participates in streptomycin biosynthesis.

References

 
 

EC 2.7.1
Enzymes of unknown structure